Guan County or Guanxian may refer to the following places in China:

Guan County, Shandong (冠县)
Gu'an County (固安县), Hebei
Dujiangyan City, formerly Guan County (灌县), Sichuan